The Catholic Church in Belize is part of the worldwide Catholic Church, under the spiritual leadership of the Pope in Rome. Bishops in Belize are members of the Antilles Episcopal Conference.

Approximately 40% of the population of Belize is Catholic. The country comes under the jurisdiction of the Diocese of Belize City-Belmopan.

The nunciature to Belize is combined with the nunciature to El Salvador. The current 
apostolic nuncio to Belize is Archbishop Luigi Pezzuto.

See also

Religion in Belize

References

 
Belize